In human mitochondrial genetics, Haplogroup K1a1b1a is a human mitochondrial DNA (mtDNA) haplogroup. 

The K1a1b1a mitochondrial DNA haplogroup subclade is found in Ashkenazi Jews and other populations. It is a subclade under haplogroup U'K.

Origin
According to National Geographic's Genographic Project, K1a1b1a has an unknown origin. The site states, "Though the origin of this lineage is not clear, it is a founding population among some Jewish Diaspora groups. Among Ashkenazi Jews, it is about 19 percent of maternal lineages. Estimates of the age of K1a1b1a vary depending on the mutation rates used. The age of K1a1b1a has been estimated at 4,800 ± 3,600 Years Ago, according to the Genographic Project. 

The K1a1b1a subclade is under the U'K haplogroup and descends from K1a1b1, which is thought to be an 11,500-year-old European subclade of mostly non Jewish origins. Haplogroup K falls under the old U8 grouping. Some of the Basque people of Spain and France fall under the U8a subclade within U8. K1a1b1a is a U8b subclade within U8, with several downstream variations. 

Ötzi, a mummy who was found September 1991 in the Ötztal Alps, is subclade K1ö for Ötzi. Ötzi has mtDNA marker 10978 in common with the Ashkenazi population and others who fall under the K1a1b1a subclade.

A new study and recent updates to the mtDNA tree uses three markers to define K1a1b1a, (114), 10978 and 16234. The marker 12954 along with the previous three markers mentioned, are used to define a new mtDNA subclade called K1a1b1a1. This new group consists of people who are either Ashkenazi or of non Ashkenazi European ancestry.

Distribution
10% of Europeans fall under the K haplogroup. It is hypothesized that the subclade represents one of four major founding maternal lineages ("founding mothers") of Ashkenazi Jews which together account for 45% of all Ashkenazi mtDNA haplotypes. Approximately 19% of Ashkenazi Jews with ancestry from Poland are in mtDNA haplogroup K1a1b1a. However, K1a1b1a has also been found in individuals of no known Jewish ancestry, and the explanation will require further research. The Genographic Project along with other research groups are looking into this phenomenon. The haplogroup is distributed in Europe and the Middle East. Estimates suggest approximately 1,600,000 Jews worldwide would be K1a1b1a.

The recently evolving field of genetic genealogy and DNA sequencing has permitted people of unknown ancestry to make use of DNA testing to establish some evidence for their ancestral origins.  Accordingly, based on the research of Behar, some connection has been established between the K1a1b1a subclade and Jewish ancestry. The notion of Romani origins for K1a1b1a is very unlikely, given the much greater genetic diversity of K1a1b1a in Jews. This suggests that the presence of K1a1b1a in Romani is more likely the result of introgression into Romani populations.

Version 3 of van Oven's Phylotree defines K1a1b1a by the highly polymorphic 114 in the second hypervariable region, 10978 and 12954 in the coding region, and 16234 in the first hypervariable region. This is supported by a growing number of Genbank samples. However, 12954 is not needed to define K1a1b1a as of 2013 and as mentioned above, is used to define K1a1b1a1. 

It may be recognized in hypervariable only samples by essential mutations:
Hypervariable region 1: 16224C, 16234T, 16311C, 16519C
Hypervariable region 2: 073G, 263G, 315.1C, 497T

Notable individuals with Haplogroup K1a1b1a
Futurist Donald Prell

Subclades

Tree
This phylogenetic tree of haplogroup K subclades is based on the paper by Mannis van Oven and Manfred Kayser Updated comprehensive phylogenetic tree of global human mitochondrial DNA variation and subsequent published research. Newer research has further updated the phylogenetic tree of haplogroup K subclades. However, the K1a1b1a1 subclade has yet to be approved and does not appear in the Build 17 PhyloTree as of February 18th, 2016. 

K1a1b1	 11470G
K1a1b1a	 10978G 12954C 16234T
K1a1b1b	 593C   2483C
K1a1b1b1  789C   11620G
K1a1b1c	 5585A  16222T
K1a1b1d	 14388G 16092C 16223T
K1a1b1e	 9932A
K1a1b1f	 4823C  6528T  8842C
K1a1b1g	 5583T  12007A

See also 
Genealogical DNA test
Genetic Genealogy
Human mitochondrial genetics
Population Genetics
Human mitochondrial DNA haplogroups

References

External links 
Websites
PhyloTree.Org 
The Genographic Project by National Geographic
Ian Logan's Mitochondrial DNA Site
Mannis van Oven's Phylotree
Charles Kerchner's  mtDNA Haplogroups Page
mtDNA Haplogroup K Project at Family Tree DNA

DNA
K1a1b1a
Ashkenazi_Jews_topics